Leslie Feinberg (September 1, 1949 – November 15, 2014) was an American butch lesbian, transgender activist, communist, and author. Feinberg authored Stone Butch Blues in 1993.  writing, notably Stone Butch Blues and  pioneering non-fiction book Transgender Warriors (1996), laid the groundwork for much of the terminology and awareness around gender studies and was instrumental in bringing these issues to a more mainstream audience.

Early life 
Feinberg was born in Kansas City, Missouri and raised in Buffalo, New York in a working-class, Jewish family. At fourteen years old,  began work at a display sign shop at a local department store. Feinberg eventually dropped out of Bennett High School, though  officially received a diploma. Feinberg began frequenting gay bars in Buffalo and  primarily worked in low-wage and temporary jobs, including washing dishes, cleaning cargo ships, working as an ASL interpreter, inputting medical data, and working at a PVC pipe factory and a book bindery.

Career 
When Feinberg was in  twenties,  met members of the Workers World Party at a demonstration for the land rights and self-determination of Palestinians and joined the Buffalo branch of the party. After moving to New York City, Feinberg took part in anti-war, anti-racist, and pro-labor demonstrations on behalf of the party for many years, including the March Against Racism (Boston, 1974), a national tour about HIV/AIDS (1983–84), and a mobilization against KKK members (Atlanta, 1988).

Feinberg began writing in the 1970s. As a member of the Workers World Party,  was the editor of the political prisoners page of the Workers World newspaper for fifteen years, and by 1995,  had become the managing editor.

Feinberg's first novel, the 1993 Stone Butch Blues, won the Lambda Literary Award and the 1994 American Library Association Gay & Lesbian Book Award. While there are parallels to Feinberg's experiences as a working-class dyke, the work is not an autobiography.  second novel, Drag King Dreams, was released in 2006.

 nonfiction work included the books Transgender Liberation: A Movement Whose Time Has Come in 1992 and Transgender Warriors: Making History from Joan of Arc to Dennis Rodman in 1996. Also in 1996, Feinberg appeared in Rosa von Praunheim's documentary, Transexual Menace. In 2009,  released Rainbow Solidarity in Defense of Cuba—a compilation of 25 journalistic articles.

In Transgender Warriors, Feinberg defines "transgender" as a very broad umbrella, including all "people who cross the cultural boundaries of gender"—including butch dykes, passing women (those who passed as men only in order to find work or survive during war), and drag queens.

Feinberg's writings on LGBT history, "Lavender & Red", frequently appeared in the Workers World newspaper. Feinberg was awarded an honorary doctorate from Starr King School for the Ministry for transgender and social justice work.

In June 2019 Feinberg was one of the inaugural fifty American "pioneers, trailblazers, and heroes" inducted on the National LGBTQ Wall of Honor within the Stonewall National Monument (SNM) in New York City's Stonewall Inn. The SNM is the first U.S. national monument dedicated to LGBTQ rights and history, and the wall's unveiling was timed to take place during the 50th anniversary of the Stonewall riots.

Illness 
In 2008, Feinberg was diagnosed with Lyme disease. She wrote that the infection first came about in the 1970s, when there was limited knowledge related to such diseases and that  felt hesitant to deal with medical professionals for many years due to  transgender identity. For this reason,  only received treatment later in life. In the 2000s, Feinberg created art and blogged about  illnesses with a focus on disability art and class consciousness.

Pronoun usage 
Feinberg stated in a 2006 interview that  pronouns varied depending on context:

Feinberg's widow wrote in  statement regarding Feinberg's death that Feinberg did not really care which pronouns a person used to address : "She preferred to use the pronouns /zie and /hir for herself, but also said: 'I care which pronoun is used, but people have been respectful to me with the wrong pronoun and disrespectful with the right one. It matters whether someone is using the pronoun as a bigot, or if they are trying to demonstrate respect.

Personal life 
Feinberg described herself as "an anti-racist white, working-class, secular Jewish, transgender, lesbian, female, revolutionary communist."

According to Julie Enszner, a friend of Feinberg's, Feinberg sometimes "passed" as a man for safety reasons.

Feinberg's spouse, Minnie Bruce Pratt, is a professor at Syracuse University in Syracuse, New York. Feinberg and Pratt married in New York and Massachusetts in 2011. In the mid and late 1990s they attended Camp Trans together.

Feinberg died on November 15, 2014, of complications due to multiple tick-borne infections, including "Lyme disease, babeisiosis, and protomyxzoa rheumatica", which  had suffered from since the 1970s.  Feinberg's last words were reported to be, "Hasten the revolution! Remember me as a revolutionary communist."

Books
 Transgender Liberation: A Movement Whose Time Has Come. World View Forum, 1992. .
 Stone Butch Blues. San Francisco: Firebrand Books, 1993. .
 Transgender Warriors: Making History from Joan of Arc to Dennis Rodman. Boston: Beacon Press, 1996. .
 Trans Liberation: Beyond Pink or Blue. Beacon Press, 1999. 
 Drag King Dreams. New York: Carroll & Graf, 2006. .
 Rainbow Solidarity in Defense of Cuba. New York: World View Forum, 2009. .

See also
 Gender neutrality in languages with gendered third-person pronouns
 LGBT culture in New York City
 List of LGBT people from New York City

References

Further reading

 Lavender & Red, Feinberg's columns in Worker's World
 Partial Academic Bibliography by M.R. Cook 
 Partial curriculum vitae

External links

 Transgender Warrior, Leslie Feinberg's Official Website

1949 births
2014 deaths
20th-century American novelists
American political writers
Jewish American novelists
Jewish activists
Jewish socialists
Lambda Literary Award winners
Stonewall Book Award winners
American lesbian writers
LGBT Jews
American LGBT novelists
LGBT people from Missouri
American LGBT rights activists
Secular Jews
Transgender novelists
Workers World Party politicians
20th-century American women writers
American women novelists
Writers from Kansas City, Missouri
Writers from Buffalo, New York
American communists
Communist women writers
Transgender Jews
LGBT people from New York (state)
Novelists from Missouri
American women non-fiction writers
Jewish anti-racism activists
Jewish women writers
American transgender writers